Magnini is an Italian surname. Notable people with the surname include:

Ardico Magnini (1928–2020), Italian football player
Filippo Magnini (born 1982), Italian swimmer

Italian-language surnames